The 2008 World Outdoor Bowls Championship men's pairs was held at the Burnside Bowling Club in Christchurch, New Zealand, from 12 to 24 January 2008.

Russell Meyer and Gary Lawson of New Zealand won the gold medal.

+ Bizarrely there is confusion as to the actual Brunei team that competed. Although HJ Brahim Naim is listed as competing in the singles & pairs he publicly announced that he was not there after missing his flight.

Section tables

Section A

Section B

Finals

Results

References

Men